A First Book of English Law is a book originally written by Owen Hood Phillips and subsequently edited by him and Anthony Hugh Hudson. It was published by Sweet and Maxwell. F.R. Crane praised it for its "lucidity, accuracy, brevity and readability" and said that it was "deservedly acclaimed".

The First Edition was published in 1948, the Second in 1953, the Third in 1955, the Fourth in 1960, the Fifth in 1965, the Sixth in 1970, and the Seventh in 1977.

References
Newark, F H (1960) 23 Modern Law Review 724 - 725 JSTOR
Pettit, P (1960) 9 International and Comparative Law Quarterly 738 - 740 JSTOR
Chloros, A G (1956) 19 Modern Law Review 456 - 457 JSTOR
Gardiner, Hilliard A (1956) 5 American Journal of Comparative Law 543 JSTOR
D H P (1949) 12 Modern Law Review 268 JSTOR
R M W D (1949) 10 Cambridge Law Journal 288 - 289 JSTOR

External links
From Google Books:
Third Edition. Snippet view.
Fourth Edition. Snippet view.
Seventh Edition.  Snippet view.

Law books
1948 non-fiction books